Carol(e) Ro(d)gers may refer to:

Carol Rogers (musician) in Omaha Black Music Hall of Fame
Carole Rodgers, character in Ann Carver's Profession